The Frameline Film Festival (aka San Francisco International LGBTQ+ Film Festival) (formerly San Francisco International LGBT Film Festival; San Francisco International Lesbian and Gay Film Festival) began as a storefront event in 1976. The first film festival, named the Gay Film Festival of Super-8 Films, was held in 1977.  The festival is organized by Frameline, a nonprofit media arts organization whose mission statement is "to change the world through the power of queer cinema". It is the oldest LGBTQ+ film festival in the world.

With annual attendance ranging from 60,000 to 80,000, it is the largest LGBTQ+ film exhibition event. It is also the most well-attended LGBTQ+ arts event in the San Francisco Bay Area. The festival is held every year in late June according to a schedule that allows the eleven-day event's closing night to coincide with the City's annual Gay Pride Day, which takes place on the last Sunday of the month.

Films screened at the Frameline Film Festival have been donated to the Hormel Center at the San Francisco Public Library. An initial donation was made in 2005, and the library partnered with the Bay Area Video Coalition (BAVC) for conservation of video recordings.

In 2020 the festival was one of the key partners, alongside Outfest Los Angeles, the New York Lesbian, Gay, Bisexual, & Transgender Film Festival and the Inside Out Film and Video Festival, in launching the North American Queer Festival Alliance, an initiative to further publicize and promote LGBT film.

Awards
The festival's annual awards include The Frameline Award given to an individual who has played a key role in the history of LGBTQ+ cinema, Audience Awards for Best Feature, Best Documentary, Best Episodic, Best Short, and Juried Awards for First Feature, and Outstanding Documentary.

See also

 Cinema of the United States
 List of LGBT film festivals

Notes

References

Further reading

External links
 
  Frameline Program Guides 
  Frameline Film Festival Collection at Online Archive of California
  San Francisco International Lesbian and Gay Film Festival at WorldCat
  Frameline Film Festival Trailers YouTube Playlist

1977 establishments in California
Annual events in California
Film festivals established in 1977
Film festivals in the San Francisco Bay Area
LGBT film festivals in the United States
LGBT culture in San Francisco
LGBT events in California